Ghodagaun  is a village development committee in Rolpa District in the Rapti Zone of north-eastern Nepal. At the time of the 1991 Nepal census it had a population of 241 people living in 476 individual households. Ghodagaun has now changed in Sunilsmritee Rural Municipalities 1 Number ward. linkage of road and communication is well. Shree Rameshwari Higher Secondary School is the main educational institute of Ghodagaun.

References

Populated places in Rolpa District